First Target is a 2000 American-Canadian made-for-television action-thriller film and a sequel to First Daughter (1999) with Daryl Hannah taking over the role of Agent Alex McGregor. The film co-stars Doug Savant and Gregory Harrison, reprising their roles of Grant Coleman and President Jonathan Hayes.

Plot
The Secret Service attempt to prevent an elaborately plotted assassination attempt on the President.

Secret Service Agent Alex McGregor (Daryl Hannah) is charged with protecting President Jonathan Hayes (Gregory Harrison) who is facing problems with a powerful group represented by his Vice-President of the United States, and entrepreneur Senator Jack "J.P." Hunter who helped him win the election. Alex's fiancée Grant Coleman (Doug Savant) is now close friends with the President after helping save Jess' life after the kidnapping, and intends to marry Alex.

The conspirators intend to assassinate the President while in Seattle to inaugurate the cable wire transportation Skytran and they hire professional killer/seductress Nina Stahl and her hacker brother Evan.

With part of the Secret Service compromised and serving the purposes of the Vice-President, Alex faces difficulties protecting the President.

Cast
 Daryl Hannah as Secret Service Agent Alex McGregor
 Doug Savant as Grant Coleman
 Gregory Harrison as President Jonathan Hayes
 Ken Camroux as Vice President
 Brandy Ledford as Secret Service Agent Kelsey Innes
 Peter Flemming as Stewart McCall
 Gary Bakewell as Ryan Nicholson
 Tom Butler as Senator Jack "J.P." Hunter
 Robert Wisden as Brinkman
 Jason Schombing as Jack Bryant
 Ona Grauer as Nina Stahl
 Aaron Grain as Evan Stahl
 Terrence Kelly as Clay

Reception

Legacy
Quentin Tarantino got the idea to cast Daryl Hannah in Kill Bill after seeing First Target on cable television.

References

External links
 
 

2000 television films
2000 films
2000 action thriller films
Films about fictional presidents of the United States
Films directed by Armand Mastroianni
Films scored by Louis Febre
Television sequel films
TBS original films
Action television films
American thriller television films
2000s American films